Eastnor  is a village in Herefordshire, England,  east of Ledbury and the same distance from the tripoint of the county with Worcestershire and Gloucestershire.

Eastnor Castle built by Earl Somers (d.1841) is within its medieval-founded parish which it is named after. The settlement is also the main settlement of its civil parish.

The 12th-century church of St John the Baptist was redesigned and rebuilt by Sir George Gilbert Scott in 1852 and is a grade I listed building.  Eastnor Lake occupies a similar area to the village centre and is at the point where two streams from the north join to form the Glynch Brook, one of two similar axis left-bank tributaries of the River Leadon.

References

External links

Villages in Herefordshire